John Walter Cranford (July 28, 1859March 3, 1899) was an American attorney and politician from Texas. A Democrat, he was most notable for his service as president pro tem of the Texas Senate and a member of the United States House of Representatives.

Biography
Cranford was born near Grove Hill, Alabama on July 28, 1859, the son of Dr. James H. Cranford and Caroline (Bettis) Cranford. He received his initial education in Alabama, and after the end of the American Civil War in 1865, Cranford's parents moved to Hopkins County, Texas. Cranford's mother died when he was young, and he was raised by his father.

After moving to Texas, Cranford attended the schools of Hopkins County and studied under a private tutor, and worked a variety of jobs to earn room and board and tuition. He studied law under a local attorney, attained admission to the bar, and established a practice in Sulphur Springs, Texas.

In 1888, Cranford won election to the Texas Senate representing the 5th district (Hunt, Hopkins, Delta, Franklin, and Camp Counties). He served until 1896, and was chairman of the committees on State Affairs and Engrossed Bills. Cranford was the senate's president pro tem from 1890 to 1891.

Cranford was elected to the 55th United States Congress in 1896. He served from March 4, 1897 until his death in Washington, D.C. on March 3, 1899, which was also the final day of his term. He was interred in the City Cemetery, Sulphur Springs, Texas.

Family
In 1880, Cranford married Medora Ury of Sulphur Springs.

See also
List of United States Congress members who died in office (1790–1899)

References

External links

1859 births
1899 deaths
People from Grove Hill, Alabama
People from Sulphur Springs, Texas
Democratic Party Texas state senators
Democratic Party members of the United States House of Representatives from Texas
19th-century American politicians